Cyclophora may refer to:
 Cyclophora (alga), a diatom genus in the Fragilariophyceae
 Cyclophora (moth), an insect genus